Alberto Carnevalli Airport  is an airport located  southwest of downtown Mérida, the capital of Mérida State in Venezuela. It is named in honor of Alberto Carnevalli (es), a Venezuelan lawyer and political activist.

The airport is in the Chama River valley in the Andean mountains, surrounded by higher terrain in all quadrants. Night operations are prohibited. Commercial service resumed to Caracas on 1 August 2013, after being suspended for 5 years due to the crash of Santa Bárbara Airlines Flight 518.

Until 2008, it was the main airport in the state of Merida and one of the most important in the Andean region and the country, at which time new regulations limited commercial operations there.

Commercial aircraft that operated on the airport
ATR 42
ATR 72
Beechcraft 1900D
Boeing 727-200
Boeing 737-300
Bombardier Q400
Convair CV-240 family
Douglas DC-3
Embraer EMB 120 Brasilia
Fokker 50
McDonnell Douglas DC-9-30

History and description
Inaugurated in 1946, this airport was located on the outskirts of the city, but the rapid urban growth during the 1960s and 1970s soon left it surrounded by houses and buildings on all four sides.

It has an air terminal with services such as car rental, excursions to places of tourist interest, sale of air tickets, taxi line, cafeteria, restaurant and commercial shops. The airport does not have customs or beacons, so it cannot accommodate international or night flights. The entries and exits are carried out through the visual corridors "Rio Chama" to the WSW, "Observatorio" to the ENE, "El Morro" to the South and "El Valle" to the North. Operations are governed by VFR flight rules as there are no radio aids nearby.

Its infrastructure consists of an air terminal that offers car rental services, excursions to tourist sites, air ticket sales, taxi line, cafeteria, restaurant and several shops. Private flights are coordinated by BAER and INAC staff and the General Aviation ramp parking is free.

This airport is not equipped with customs, so it cannot accommodate international flights. Entrances and exits are carried out through the visual corridors Rio Chama to WSW, El Morro to the South and El Valle to the North, operations are governed by VFR flight rules because there are no radio aids nearby, nor does it have beaconing so after sunset or under conditions of poor visibility the airport is disabled and any pending flight is diverted to El Vigia at 1 hour by car.

A famous event occurred in 1985 when a Douglas Dc-9-30 plane from the company Aeropostal, with the registration YV24C, landed in Merida with Pope John Paul II.

After the crash of SBA Airlines flight 518, the only approach mode approved by the aviation authorities was the Chama River corridor.

Accidents and incidents
On 21 February 2008, Santa Bárbara Airlines Flight 518, an ATR 42-300 twin-turboprop en route to Caracas, crashed shortly after takeoff from Carnevalli, killing all 46 people on board. The cause of the accident was pilot error caused by disorientation and rushed procedures.

See also
Transport in Venezuela
List of airports in Venezuela

References

External links
OurAirports - Mérida
SkyVector - Mérida
OpenStreetMap - Mérida
airlinecodes.co.uk entry
airportlist.com entry
Reuters article about Flight 518 accident

Airports in Venezuela
Airports established in 1956
Buildings and structures in Mérida (state)
Buildings and structures in Mérida, Mérida